B Complete (stylized as B:COMPLETE) is the debut extended play by the first ever Brand New Music boy band, AB6IX. The album was released digitally and physically on May 22, 2019, by Brand New Music.

Background and release
After the announcement of the group being formed, they released a music video for "Hollywood" performing as a full five member group.

On April 30, 2019 it was revealed that AB6IX would debut with extended play titled B Complete with the title track "Breathe".

The music video, together with the EP, was released on May 22.

Promotion 
"Hollywood" was performed by only four of the members during Mnet's survival show Produce 101 (season 2), for their judges grade evaluation. Also "Hollywood" together with "Shining Stars" were performed before release date at Dream Concert and Kcon Japan.

AB6IX had their debut showcase on May 22 at Olympic Hall in Songpa-gu, Seoul where they performed title track "Breathe" along with "Shining Star", "Absolute" and "Hollywood".

The group started promoting their title track "Breathe" on May 23. They first performed the lead single on Mnet's M Countdown, followed by performances on KBS' Music Bank, MBC's Show! Music Core and SBS' Inkigayo.

Track listing 
Credits adapted from Melon

Charts

Weekly charts

Monthly charts

Year-end charts

Sales

Awards

Music programs

Release history

References 

2019 debut EPs
AB6IX albums
Korean-language EPs